The Battle of Bhupalgarh occurred between the Mughal Empire and Maratha Empire in 1679. After a fierce bloody resistance to the siege lasting over 55 days, the battle resulted in the razing of the fort of Bhupalgarh and a decisive victory for the Mughals under general Diler Khan.

After terrible fighting, the Mughals captured the fortress and its stores and enslaved the garrison. Diler Khan then defeated Maratha reinforcements nearby and razed the fort to the ground.

Result
The Marathas were defeated by the Mughals in this battle. 
Also the fort of Bhupalgarh was razed by the Mughals.

References

Bhupalgarh 1679
Bhupalgarh
Shivaji
1679 in India
Bhupalgarh